Donald “Donnie” Joseph Gedling was a member of the Kentucky House of Representatives from 1985 to 1995 representing the 18th district.  He was also a tobacco farmer from Breckinridge County, Kentucky.

First election and early General Assembly work
Gedling was first elected to the Kentucky General Assembly in 1984 when he ran unopposed as a Democrat from Hardinsburg, Kentucky.  
At the time, the district was composed of Breckinridge County as well as parts of Meade and Hancock Counties.  He ran unopposed again in 1986 and 1988.

During this time he served on the House's Agricultural and Small Business Committee and the State Government Committee.  He was the Vice Chairman of the Counties and Special Districts Committee.  He also served as Chairman of the General Assembly's Tobacco Task Force.

Later General Assembly work
In 1990, Gedling received his first challenge for his seat when Republican James Holbrook ran against him.  He defeated Holbrook with 73 percent of the vote.  In 1992, he again ran unopposed.  By this time, parts of Hardin County had been added to the district.

In the late 1980s and early 1990s Gedling became known as a fierce defender of tobacco and smokers’ rights.  In 1990 he was able to get a Smokers’ Bill of Rights bill passed by the Kentucky House of Representatives.  During this time he was still the Chairman of the General Assembly's Tobacco Task Force.  He was highly critical of the University of Louisville when it became the first state university in Kentucky to have smoking restrictions.  He thought it was very hypocritical to take state funds (much of which came from the tobacco industry) and then try to ban the product from areas of campus.

In Gedling's later terms he was a member of the Joint Committee on Agricultural and Natural Resources; the Joint Committee on Counties, Special Districts, and Local Government; the Joint Committee on State Government; the Tobacco Task Force; and a sub-committee for rural fire protection. .

In 1994 Gedling retired and his son, Joey, lost the election to Republican Dwight D. Butler, 55 percent to 45 percent.

Post political career
Gedling has set up a scholarship in his name for any students from Breckinridge or Hancock counties in Kentucky who attend Brescia University in Owensboro, Kentucky.

References

Year of birth missing (living people)
Living people
Members of the Kentucky House of Representatives
People from Breckinridge County, Kentucky